Arnold Kendall (6 April 1925 – 12 December 2003) was an English professional footballer who played as a winger. Active in the Football League between 1949 and 1959, Kendall made over 300 League appearances for Bradford City, Rochdale and Bradford Park Avenue. Kendall later played non-league football for a number of teams including Wigan Rovers, Wisbech Town, Buxton, Skelmersdale United, Goole Town and Bridlington Town, before retiring in 1963.

He began his career with Salts, moving from them to Bradford City in February 1949.

References

1925 births
2003 deaths
Footballers from Halifax, West Yorkshire
English footballers
Association football wingers
Bradford City A.F.C. players
Rochdale A.F.C. players
Bradford (Park Avenue) A.F.C. players
Wigan Rovers F.C. players
Wisbech Town F.C. players
Buxton F.C. players
Skelmersdale United F.C. players
Goole Town F.C. players
Bridlington Town A.F.C. players
English Football League players
Place of death missing
Salts F.C. players